The Emil and Ottilie Wienecke House is a historic house located at 1325 NW. Federal Street in Bend, Oregon. It was completed in 1924 and was listed on the National Register of Historic Places on May 29, 2008.

See also
 National Register of Historic Places listings in Deschutes County, Oregon

References

1924 establishments in Oregon
Houses completed in 1924
Houses on the National Register of Historic Places in Bend, Oregon